Asimov is a Jewish surname of Russian origin; see "Isaac Asimov#Surname" for its genesis. Notable people with the surname include:

Isaac Asimov (1920–1992), American essayist, scientist, novelist, written commentator, science fiction writer
Janet Asimov (1926–2019), American science fiction writer, wife of Isaac
Stanley Asimov (1929–1995), American journalist and newspaper executive, former vice-president for editorial administration at Newsday, brother of Isaac
Eric Asimov (born 1957), American wine critic, son of Stanley
Daniel A. Asimov, mathematician, son of Stanley
Nanette Asimov (born c. 1959), American journalist for the San Francisco Chronicle, daughter of Stanley

See also
Azimov, a related last name

Russian-Jewish surnames
Russian-language surnames